Caroline Wozniacki was the defending champion for the second year running, and once again won in the final 6–3, 3–6, 6–3 against Nadia Petrova to clinch her third straight New Haven crown.

Seeds
The top two seeds receive a bye into the second round.

Draw

Finals

Top half

Bottom half

References

External links
 WTA tournament draws

Women's Singles